L. rosea may refer to:
 Laguncularia rosea, a plant species in the genus Laguncularia
 Lapageria rosea, the copihue, Chilean bellflower or Lapageria, a plant species

See also
 Rosea (disambiguation)